Moho Province is a province of the Puno Region in Peru.

Political division 
The province measures  and is divided into four districts:

Ethnic groups 
The people in the province are mainly indigenous citizens of Aymara descent. Aymara is the language which the majority of the population (85.42%) learnt to speak in childhood, 13.70% of the residents started speaking using the Spanish language and  0.55% using Quechua (2007 Peru Census).

See also 
 Mirq'imarka

References 

Provinces of the Puno Region